Aurèle Émile "Mighty Atom, Little Giant" Joliat (August 29, 1901 – June 2, 1986) was a Canadian professional ice hockey left winger who played 16 seasons in the National Hockey League for the Montreal Canadiens.

Playing career
Joliat began his organized hockey career in 1916, playing for several Canadian amateur teams in Ottawa and Iroquois Falls, Ontario.

Joliat had signed a contract to play for the Saskatoon Crescents of the Western Canada Hockey League for the 1922–23 season, but his contract rights were traded to the Montreal Canadiens when Crescents' manager Frederick E. Betts sought to sign aging superstar Newsy Lalonde as a player-coach.

At first, the deal of an unknown for the greatest player in the game was wildly unpopular with Habs fans, but the "Little Giant" proved an immediate success on the ice. The following season, Joliat helped the Canadiens to the Stanley Cup in 1924 over the WCHL's Calgary Tigers. He helped the Canadiens win two more cups in 1930 and 1931.

Joliat proved noteworthy as a two-way forward, particularly for the ability to counterattack after a breakup.  Despite his lack of size—at 5′7″ and 136 lbs, Joliat was one of the smallest players in the game—he was also notable for a refusal to back off from on-ice confrontations.

His breakout season was 1925, when teamed with Howie Morenz and Billy Boucher, Joliat scored 29 goals to lead the NHL, and his 41 points would be a career high. He would remain an impact scorer for the Habs through the 1938 season, and retired the following year, reportedly devastated by Morenz's recent death.

Retirement
Joliat finished his career with 270 goals and 460 points in 655 games.  At the time of his retirement, Joliat was the NHL career leader in games played, a mark he held until surpassed by Hooley Smith in 1940.

He was inducted into the Hockey Hall of Fame in 1947.

In a 1985 Montreal Canadiens Old-Timers game, Joliat skated around the Montreal Forum to a huge ovation as a "special treat" for the fans.  Despite falling twice over TV cables on the ice, he quickly stood up and finished his skate, the trademark black cap he wore back in his playing days held in his hand.

Joliat continued to skate along Ottawa's Rideau Canal well into his 80s and died at the age of 84 in 1986; after seeing his beloved Canadiens win their 23rd Stanley Cup earlier that year and was buried in Notre Dame Cemetery in Ottawa, Ontario.

Achievements and facts

 At the time of his retirement, Joliat was third, behind Nels Stewart and his teammate Howie Morenz, for goals scored in NHL history to that date.
 Ranked 65th on The Hockey News list of the 100 greatest NHL players of all time.
 Named to the inaugural NHL first All-Star team at left wing in 1931.
 Named a Second Team All-Star in 1932, 1934 and 1935.
 He scored the first documented empty net goal in NHL history. The goal, with twelve seconds to play, sealed the Canadiens' January 21, 1932, home win against the Toronto Maple Leafs.
 Won the Hart Memorial Trophy as the NHL's Most Valuable Player in 1934.
 Despite playing in an era where seasons totaled no more than 48 games, Joliat remains in ninth place all-time on the Canadiens' career goal-scoring list and second among left wingers to Steve Shutt.
 Named to the 75th Anniversary All-Time Team by the Canadiens in 1984.
 His number 4 jersey was "co-retired" in 1984, having been previously retired in Jean Béliveau's honour, yet no banner for Joliat hangs in the Bell Centre.
 His brother Bobby Joliat also played professional hockey.
 He was the referee when Maurice Richard played his first NHL game in 1942.
 He was the inspiration for Wilson MacDonald's 1935 poem "Monsieur Joliat".

Career statistics

Source:

* Stanley Cup Champion.

References

External links
 

1901 births
1986 deaths
Burials at Notre-Dame Cemetery (Ottawa)
Canadian ice hockey left wingers
Franco-Ontarian people
Hart Memorial Trophy winners
Hockey Hall of Fame inductees
Ice hockey people from Ottawa
Montreal Canadiens players
Stanley Cup champions